Petrophila bifascialis, the two-banded petrophila moth, is a moth in the family Crambidae. It was described by Robinson in 1869. It is found in North America, where it has been recorded from Nova Scotia to Florida, west to Texas and north to Ontario.

The wingspan is between 11–24 mm. The forewings are whitish with a brownish-orange band across the median area, and three bands near the apex. The hindwings are white with an orange band bordered by a greyish band in the median area. Adults are on wing from late May to September.

The larvae are aquatic, feeding on diatoms and algae.

See also 

 List of moths of Canada
 List of moths of the United States

References

Petrophila
Moths described in 1869

Moths of North America